Alexandre de Thy was a French Navy officer. He served in the War of American Independence.

Biography 
Thy was born to an aristocratic family. He was cousin to Nicolas-Christiern de Thy de Milly.

Thy joined the Navy as a Garde-Marine on 8 January 1751. He was promoted to ensign in 1755, and Lieutenant on 1 October 1764. He spent most of his career in the Eastern Mediterranean.

In 1733, he was made a Knight in the Order of Saint Louis.

On 13 March 1779, he was promoted to captain. He commanded the 74-gun Citoyen in the Squadron under De Grasse, and took part in the Battle of the Saintes, where he was wounded. He was acquitted in the subsequent inquiry into the battle. 

On 1 May 1786, he was promoted to Chef de Division. The year after, De Thy expressed strong reservations about Buor's treaty of naval tactics.

Sources and references 
 Notes

Citations

References
 
 
 
 

French Navy officers
French military personnel of the American Revolutionary War